Alle dagen feest  is a 1976 Dutch film directed by Ate de Jong and  Otto Jongerius.

External links 
 

Dutch drama films
1976 films
1970s Dutch-language films
Films directed by Ate de Jong